Programmed cell death protein 1, also known as PD-1 and  CD279 (cluster of differentiation 279), is a protein on the surface of T and B cells that has a role in regulating the immune system's response to the cells of the human body by down-regulating the immune system and promoting self-tolerance by suppressing T cell inflammatory activity. This prevents autoimmune diseases, but it can also prevent the immune system from killing cancer cells.

PD-1 is an immune checkpoint and guards against autoimmunity through two mechanisms. First, it promotes apoptosis (programmed cell death) of antigen-specific T-cells in lymph nodes. Second, it reduces apoptosis in regulatory T cells (anti-inflammatory, suppressive T cells).

PD-1 inhibitors, a new class of drugs that block PD-1, activate the immune system to attack tumors and are used to treat certain types of cancer.

The PD-1 protein in humans is encoded by the PDCD1 gene. PD-1 is a cell surface receptor that belongs to the immunoglobulin superfamily and is expressed on T cells and pro-B cells. PD-1 binds two ligands, PD-L1 and PD-L2.

Discovery 

In a screen for genes involved in apoptosis, Yasumasa Ishida, Tasuku Honjo  and colleagues at Kyoto University in 1992 discovered and named PD-1. In 1999, the same group demonstrated that mice where PD-1 was knocked down were prone to autoimmune disease and hence concluded that PD-1 was a negative regulator of immune responses.

Structure 

PD-1 is a type I membrane protein of 288 amino acids. PD-1 is a member of the extended CD28/CTLA-4 family of T cell regulators. The protein's structure includes an extracellular IgV domain followed by a transmembrane region and an intracellular tail. The intracellular tail contains two phosphorylation sites located in an immunoreceptor tyrosine-based inhibitory motif and an immunoreceptor tyrosine-based switch motif, which suggests that PD-1 negatively regulates T-cell receptor TCR signals. This is consistent with binding of SHP-1 and SHP-2 phosphatases to the cytoplasmic tail of PD-1 upon ligand binding. In addition, PD-1 ligation up-regulates E3-ubiquitin ligases CBL-b and c-CBL that trigger T cell receptor down-modulation. PD-1 is expressed on the surface of activated T cells, B cells, and macrophages, suggesting that compared to CTLA-4, PD-1 more broadly negatively regulates immune responses.

Ligands 

PD-1 has two ligands, PD-L1 and PD-L2, which are members of the B7 family. PD-L1 protein is upregulated on macrophages and dendritic cells (DC) in response to LPS and GM-CSF treatment, and on T cells and B cells upon TCR and B cell receptor signaling, whereas in resting mice, PD-L1 mRNA can be detected in the heart, lung, thymus, spleen, and kidney. PD-L1 is expressed on almost all murine tumor cell lines, including PA1 myeloma, P815 mastocytoma, and B16 melanoma upon treatment with IFN-γ. PD-L2 expression is more restricted and is expressed mainly by DCs and a few tumor lines.

Function 

Several lines of evidence suggest that PD-1 and its ligands negatively regulate immune responses. PD-1 knockout mice have been shown to develop lupus-like glomerulonephritis and dilated cardiomyopathy on the C57BL/6 and BALB/c backgrounds, respectively. In vitro, treatment of anti-CD3 stimulated T cells with PD-L1-Ig results in reduced T cell proliferation and IFN-γ secretion. IFN-γ is a key pro-inflammatory cytokine that promotes T cell inflammatory activity. Reduced T cell proliferation was also correlated with attenuated IL-2 secretion and together, these data suggest that PD-1 negatively regulates T cell responses.

Experiments using PD-L1 transfected DCs and PD-1 expressing transgenic (Tg) CD4+ and CD8+ T cells suggest that CD8+ T cells are more susceptible to inhibition by PD-L1, although this could be dependent on the strength of TCR signaling. Consistent with a role in negatively regulating CD8+ T cell responses, using an LCMV viral vector model of chronic infection, Rafi Ahmed's group showed that the PD-1-PD-L1 interaction inhibits activation, expansion and acquisition of effector functions of virus specific CD8+ T cells, which can be reversed by blocking the PD-1-PD-L1 interaction.

Expression of PD-L1 on tumor cells inhibits anti-tumor activity through engagement of PD-1 on effector T cells.  Expression of PD-L1 on tumors is correlated with reduced survival in esophageal, pancreatic and other types of cancers, highlighting this pathway as a target for immunotherapy. Triggering PD-1, expressed on monocytes and up-regulated upon monocytes activation, by its ligand PD-L1 induces IL-10 production which inhibits CD4 T-cell function.

In mice, expression of this gene is induced in the thymus when anti-CD3 antibodies are injected and large numbers of thymocytes undergo apoptosis. Mice deficient for this gene bred on a BALB/c background developed dilated cardiomyopathy and died from congestive heart failure. These studies suggest that this gene product may also be important in T cell function and contribute to the prevention of autoimmune diseases.

Overexpression of PD1 on CD8+ T cells is one of the indicators of T-cell exhaustion (e.g. in chronic infection or cancer).

Clinical significance

Cancer 

PD-L1, the ligand for PD1, is highly expressed in several cancers and hence the role of PD1 in cancer immune evasion is well established. Monoclonal antibodies targeting PD-1 that boost the immune system are being developed for the treatment of cancer. Many tumor cells express PD-L1, an immunosuppressive PD-1 ligand; inhibition of the interaction between PD-1 and PD-L1 can enhance T-cell responses in vitro and mediate preclinical antitumor activity. This is known as immune checkpoint blockade.

Combination therapy using both anti-PD1 along with anti-CTLA4 therapeutics have emerged as important tumor treatments within the field of checkpoint inhibition.

A combination of PD1 and CTLA4 antibodies has been shown to be more effective than either antibody alone in the treatment of a variety of cancers. The effects of the two antibodies do not appear to be redundant.  Anti-CTLA4 treatment leads to an enhanced antigen specific T cell dependent immune reaction while anti-PD-1 appears to reactivate CD8+ T cells ability to lyse cancer cells.

In clinical trials, combination therapy has been shown to be effective in reducing tumor size in patients that are unresponsive to single co-inhibitory blockade, despite increasing levels of toxicity due to anti-CTLA4 treatment. A combination of PD1 and CTLA4 induced up to a ten-fold higher number of CD8+ T cells that are actively infiltrating the tumor tissue. The authors hypothesized that the higher levels of CD8+ T cell infiltration was due to anti-CTLA-4 inhibited the conversion of CD4 T cells to T regulator cells and further reduced T regulatory suppression with anti-PD-1. This combination promoted a more robust inflammatory response to the tumor that reduced the size of the cancer. Most recently, the FDA has approved a combination therapy with both anti-CTLA4 (ipilimumab) and anti-PD1 (nivolumab) in October 2015.

The molecular factors and receptors necessary making a tumor receptive to anti-PD1 treatment remains unknown. PD-L1 expression on the surface on cancer cells plays a significant role. PD-L1 positive tumors were twice as likely to respond to combination treatment. However patients with PD-L1 negative tumors also have limited response to anti-PD1, demonstrating that PD-L1 expression is not an absolute determinant of the effectiveness of therapy.

Higher mutational burden in the tumor is correlated with a greater effect of the anti-PD-1 treatment. In clinical trials, patients who benefited from anti-PD1 treatment had cancers, such as melanoma, bladder cancer, and gastric cancer, that had a median higher average number of mutations than the patients who did not respond to the therapy. However, the correlation between higher tumor burden and the clinical effectiveness of PD-1 immune blockade is still uncertain.

The 2018 Nobel prize for medicine was awarded to James P Allison and Tasuku Honjo "for their discovery of cancer therapy by inhibition of negative immune regulation".

Anti-PD-1 therapeutics 

A number of cancer immunotherapy agents that target the PD-1 receptor have been developed.

One such anti-PD-1 antibody drug, nivolumab, (Opdivo - Bristol-Myers Squibb), produced complete or partial responses in non-small-cell lung cancer, melanoma, and renal-cell cancer, in a clinical trial with a total of 296 patients. Colon and pancreatic cancer did not have a response. Nivolumab (Opdivo, Bristol-Myers Squibb) was approved in Japan in July 2014 and by the US FDA in December 2014 to treat metastatic melanoma.

Pembrolizumab (Keytruda, MK-3475, Merck), which also targets PD-1 receptors, was approved by the FDA in Sept 2014 to treat metastatic melanoma. Pembrolizumab has been made accessible to advanced melanoma patients in the UK via UK Early Access to Medicines Scheme (EAMS) in March 2015. It is being used in clinical trials in the US for lung cancer, lymphoma, and mesothelioma. It has had measured success, with little side effects. It is up to the manufacturer of the drug to submit application to the FDA for approval for use in these diseases. On October 2, 2015 Pembrolizumab was approved by FDA for advanced (metastatic) non-small cell lung cancer (NSCLC) patients whose disease has progressed after other treatments.

Other drugs in early stage development targeting PD-1 receptors (checkpoint inhibitors) are Pidilizumab (CT-011, Cure Tech), BMS-936559 (Bristol Myers Squibb) and Toripalimab (JS-001, TopAlliance), a humanized IgG4 monoclonal antibody against PD-1.  Both Atezolizumab (MPDL3280A, Roche) and Avelumab (Merck KGaA, Darmstadt, Germany & Pfizer) target the similar PD-L1 receptor.

Animal studies

HIV 

Drugs targeting PD-1 in combination with other negative immune checkpoint receptors, such as (TIGIT), may augment immune responses and/or facilitate HIV eradication. T lymphocytes exhibit elevated expression of PD-1 in cases of chronic HIV infection. Heightened presence of the PD-1 receptors corresponds to exhaustion of the HIV specific CD8+ cytotoxic and CD4+ helper T cell populations that are vital in combating the virus. Immune blockade of PD-1 resulted in restoration of T cell inflammatory phenotype necessary to combat the progression of disease.

Alzheimer's disease 

Blocking of PD-1 leads to a reduction in cerebral amyloid-β plaques and improves cognitive performance in mice. Immune blockade of PD-1 evoked an IFN-γ dependent immune response that recruited monocyte-derived macrophages to the brain that were then capable of clearing the amyloid-β plaques from the tissue. Repeated administrations with anti-PD-1 were found to be necessary to maintain the therapeutic effects of the treatment. Amyloid fibrils are immunosuppressive and this finding has been separately confirmed by examining the effects of the fibrils in neuroinflammatory diseases. PD-1 counteracts the effects of the fibrils by boosting immune activity and triggering an immune pathway that allows for brain repair.

References

Further reading

External links 
 
 

 What I Talk about When I Talk about the Discovery of PD-1 (Yasumasa Ishida)
 PD-1_Project PD-1 project - Honjo Lab
 PD-1プロジェクト(in Japanese) - Honjo Lab

Clusters of differentiation
Immune system